Metawa Abouelkhir (born 20 October 1976) is a Paralympian athlete from Egypt competing mainly in category F57 throwing events.

Athletics career
Abouelkhir first competed in a Summer Paralympics the 2000 Summer Paralympics in Sydney, Australia. There he competed in the F58 discus throw, winning silver with a distance of 50.75 metres. Four years later he appeared at the 2004 Summer Paralympics in Athens, where he entered both the discus and shot put, but failed to reach the podium in either. He missed the Beijing Games, but returned for the 2012 Paralympics in London, winning the bronze in the F57/58 discus.

As well as Paralympic success, Abouelkhir has also won medals at World Championship level, winning medals at three different tournaments. His most successful World Championships was at the 2002 Lille Games, winning gold in the F57/58 discus throw.

Notes

Paralympic athletes of Egypt
Athletes (track and field) at the 2000 Summer Paralympics
Athletes (track and field) at the 2004 Summer Paralympics
Athletes (track and field) at the 2012 Summer Paralympics
Paralympic silver medalists for Egypt
Paralympic bronze medalists for Egypt
Living people
1976 births
Medalists at the 2000 Summer Paralympics
Medalists at the 2012 Summer Paralympics
Medalists at the 2016 Summer Paralympics
Egyptian male shot putters
Egyptian male discus throwers
Volleyball players at the 2016 Summer Paralympics
Men's sitting volleyball players
Paralympic medalists in athletics (track and field)
Paralympic medalists in volleyball
Paralympic shot putters
Paralympic discus throwers